Franz Josef Andrysek (8 February 1906 – 9 February 1981) was an Austrian weightlifter who competed in the 1924 Summer Olympics and in the 1928 Summer Olympics.

He was born and died in Vienna. In 1924 he finished 18th in the featherweight class. Four years later at the 1928 Games he won the gold medal in the featherweight class.

References

External links
 
 

1906 births
1981 deaths
Austrian male weightlifters
Olympic weightlifters of Austria
Olympic gold medalists for Austria
Olympic medalists in weightlifting
Weightlifters at the 1924 Summer Olympics
Weightlifters at the 1928 Summer Olympics
Medalists at the 1928 Summer Olympics
World record setters in weightlifting
Sportspeople from Vienna
20th-century Austrian people